Nightwatch, also known as Nighteater, is a fictional character appearing in American comic books published by Marvel Comics. He exists in Marvel's main shared universe, known as the Marvel Universe.

Publication history
Nightwatch's alter ego, Dr. Kevin Barry Trench, first appeared in 1993, in Web of Spider-Man #97. Trench went and took on the Nightwatch identity two issues later, in Web of Spider-Man #99.

Most of his appearances came in the 1990s in various titles starring Spider-Man and in his own short-lived, self-titled key series. One of his more prominent roles was in the Maximum Carnage crossover, a fourteen-part miniseries that ran in the Spider-Man titles in 1993. The character returned in a 2014-2015 storyline in She-Hulk, in which he was retroactively revealed as originally being a supervillain known as Nighteater.

Fictional character biography

Original appearances
Doctor Kevin Trench, upon witnessing a costumed man seemingly die battling some terrorists armed with invisibility-generating 'cloaking" devices, unmasked the body afterward to learn that it was an older version of himself.

Freaking out, Trench stripped the costume from "his" body and fled to a deserted island, reasoning that if he just never wore the suit or went home, he would not die. Events conspired to bring him back, as the criminal Alfredo stole one of the costume gloves after washing up on the island and being nursed to health by Trench. After Alfredo had been dealt with, Trench decided that he could not avoid his destiny, and decided to investigate the costume's origins.

As the superhero Nightwatch, Trench battled menaces such as the "Maximum Carnage" gang, who were wreaking havoc across New York and slaughtering dozens of innocent civilians. He had many allies in the fight, including, but not limited to, Captain America, Black Cat, Deathlok and Firestar. He also fought the mutated Deathmask.  Graduating into his own book, Nightwatch encountered similar "cloaked" villains, and was shocked when their technology merged with and enhanced his costume.  In between battling menaces like Flashpoint, Cardiac (whose technology had been stolen to create the more vicious Cardiaxe), and Venom, Nightwatch discovered that an old ex-girlfriend was working for the shady Morelle Pharmaceuticals on a nanotech project.

Ultimately, project head Phillip Morelle proved to be recklessly conducting nanotech experiments to make a replacement skin for his dying son Justin.  Nightwatch fought his way onto Phillip Morelle's space station to confront him but not before Phillip sends two assassins into the past to kill Nightwatch using his nanotechnology to open a time portal. Much to both Nightwatch and Phillips surprise that same time technology allows a future version of Justin Morelle to travel into the present.  Future Justin, armed with a more advanced version of Nightwatch's own suit, kills his father and reveals that the nanotechnology his father was developing produced a dangerously unstable energy matrix that in his timeline devastated North America killing billions.   Justin upgraded Nightwatch's armor to its final evolution and the two of them worked together to destroy the space station before the disaster could happen. In the present-day epilogue, Justin Morelle, the son of Phillip and Trench's ex, received the nanotech skin from the project as his father had dreamed. Seeing his ex happy with her healed son, Nightwatch seemingly chose to travel into the past and complete the time loop with Cardiac's help, ensuring his own death but also ensuring the cataclysm timeline would never come to pass ensuring this happy ending would be the true timeline. The series seemingly ends with Kevin's trip into the past while the future Justin's fate remains unclear. Sometime later, still in the present, Nightwatch is shot in the chest by El Toro Negro, and uses the last of his costume's power to go back in time to warn his past self. In the past, he is distracted by a fight with terrorists and seemingly dies before he can warn himself.

She-Hulk Vol. 3
The character reappears in the 2014-2015 run of She-Hulk. In the story, Kevin Trench reappears in street clothes at the newly established law practice of Jennifer Walters, a.k.a. the She-Hulk, regarding a legal case referred to only as "the blue file", involving several costumed superhumans, including Walters and Trench, which an unrevealed agency seems determined to keep unresolved. Trench is revealed to have survived his original previously established "death", that his original younger self had merely mistaken him for dead and stripped his body, and working in the past, he is stated as having previously and continuing to currently "keeping....an extremely low profile", using the Nightwatch nanotech sparingly while maintaining a medical practice and doing charity work until he had returned chronologically to the present, significantly older and wealthy. He aids Walters in beating back a sudden assault from grotesque creatures, donning the Nightwatch helmet and manifesting tentacles from the inner surface of his trench coat. A few days later, he calls Walters and informs her that he has spread word of her fledgling law practice to other "guys from back in the day--people like me who took what they could from the [superhero] game and moved on", bringing an influx of new potential clients to Walters' office.

However, it is later discovered that Trench himself is behind the attempts to keep Walters from further investigating the "blue file": legal papers regarding a lawsuit filed in a North Dakota county court which names She-Hulk and a small group of heroes and villains as defendants. The suit is a mystery to all involved, as none have any recollection of the plaintiff or having participated in any event in North Dakota. Furthermore, there are no records of any kind or any memories of anyone in the superhero or local community, nor any record of the town in which the actionable event was supposed to have taken place had ever existed.

It is ultimately revealed that in the years after leaving the island, Trench became the supervillain known as "Nighteater". Eventually wishing to become a lower-level superhero for selfish reasons – realizing villains never "win" and that "heroes" are ensured respect, money, power, and a comfortable and safe retirement – Trench hired Doctor Druid, The Shocker, and Vibro to aid him in casting a powerful spell that effectively "retconned" all memories and all existing documented history into believing that "Nightwatch" had worked for years in the superhero community. The spell consumed the lives of the hundreds of residents of the North Dakota town in which it was cast. It was so successful, however, that when it was complete, four heroes who had been trying to save the town – She-Hulk, Tigra, Monica Rambeau, and Wyatt Wingfoot – immediately joined Nightwatch in bringing Druid, Shocker, and Vibro to justice. 

A lone survivor of the town, whom She-Hulk had carried outside of the town limits and had promised to bring Nighteater to justice, remained aware of Nightwatch having previously been Nighteater and of his sacrificing the townspeople's lives. After failing to convince the law enforcement or local hero communities that anything had happened whatsoever, the survivor had filed the civil suit against Trench and the other heroes and villains present, leaving behind a single document that She-Hulk's paralegal was able to locate. She was able to use this document (and her own unexplained mystic powers) to break She-Hulk and her team of their convictions in Nighteater's false history, and that he has later arranged for the lone survivor to be killed. Nightwatch a.k.a. Nighteater was then brought to justice.

Powers and abilities
Nightwatch's costume boosted his strength and durability by triggering his adrenal glands, and nanotechnologically repaired itself. His cape responded to his subconscious thoughts to move on its own to attack his foes as well as allowing him to glide on air. After he was boosted by the later-generation Morelle technology, the durability of the costume increased, the cape became more metallic, and he had something closer to true flight in addition to increased speed and eventually nanotech cutting blades. These qualities were later also applied to his trenchcoat.

In other media

Film
 A Nightwatch film was claimed to be in development for Sony's Spider-Man Universe. In March 2018, Variety reported that Spike Lee was in talks to direct the film. Lee denied being attached to the film in late 2018.

References

External links

African-American superheroes
Comics characters introduced in 1993
Marvel Comics characters who use magic
Marvel Comics male superheroes
Marvel Comics male supervillains
Marvel Comics superheroes
Marvel Comics supervillains
Fictional mass murderers
Vigilante characters in comics